Asian leaffish can refer to two families of tropical freshwater fish:

 Nandidae, a family found in both Asia and Africa
 Pristolepididae, a family found in Asia

See also
 Polycentridae, South American leaffish